Non Evans  (born 20 June 1974) is a Welsh sportswoman who has competed internationally in four different sports, rugby union, judo, weightlifting and freestyle wrestling.

Rugby

Evans made her debut for Wales against Scotland in 1996 and has played 84 times for her country up to the start of the 2010 Women's Rugby World Cup (87 caps following World Cup). She is Wales and the World all-time leading points scorer.

She announced her retirement from International Rugby in December 2010. She scored a record 64 International tries for Wales which is a World record for Men & Women's rugby.

Judo
She won silver medal at both the 1992 and 1996 Commonwealth Judo Championships and competed for Wales at the 2002 Commonwealth Games.

Weightlifting
Evans finished 9th in the under 63 kg class at the 2002 Commonwealth Games where she became the first woman to compete in two sports at the same Games.

Wrestling
In 2010, she placed 2nd in the under-59 kg class at the British Championships and earned selection for the Welsh team for 2010 Commonwealth Games. She became the first woman to compete in three sports at the Commonwealth Games.

In 2012, Evans was a BBC commentator at the London Olympic weightlifting and wrestling events.

Television appearances
In 1997, Evans competed in the sixth series of Gladiators but was defeated in the heats. That same year, Evans became the first female to report and present on men’s rugby union on the Welsh language television channel S4C.

Personal life
Evans married former Wales and Llanelli rugby union flanker Mark Perego in 2003.

Honours
Evans was appointed Member of the Order of the British Empire (MBE) in the 2011 Birthday Honours for services to sport, and was the first ever female rugby player to receive the award.

References

External links

[https://web.archive.org/web/20100831044922/http://www.rwcwomens.com/home/teams/team=2962/player=38094/index.html 2010 Women's RWC Profile]

1974 births
Bards of the Gorsedd
British female sport wrestlers
Commonwealth Games competitors for Wales
Gladiators (1992 British TV series)
Judoka at the 2002 Commonwealth Games
Lesbian sportswomen
LGBT rugby union players
Welsh LGBT sportspeople
Living people
Members of the Order of the British Empire
Rugby union players from Swansea
Sportspeople from Swansea
Weightlifters at the 2002 Commonwealth Games
Welsh rugby union players
Wales international rugby union players
Wales rugby union captains
Welsh female judoka
Welsh female rugby union players
Welsh female weightlifters
Wrestlers at the 2010 Commonwealth Games